Un orso chiamato Arturo (released in some international territories as A Bear Named Arthur) is a 1992 Italian film directed by Sergio Martino. A spy comedy in both English and Italian, it starred George Segal as a successful film composer and Carol Alt as the secret agent that he inadvertently gets mixed up with.

Cast
George Segal... Billy
Carol Alt... Alice
Doris Von Thury... Billy's Wife
Birte Berg... Psychoanalyst
Mattia Sbragia... Capone
Stefano Masciarelli... Inspector
Hal Yamanouchi... Ohnishi

References

External links

1990s spy comedy films
1992 films
Films directed by Sergio Martino
Italian comedy films
1990s English-language films
English-language Italian films
1990s Italian-language films